Little Miss Perfect is an American drama film written and directed by Marlee Roberts, starring Karlee Roberts, Izzy Palmieri,  Jeremy Fernandez and Lilla Crawford.

Plot summary 
Belle, an over-achieving high school freshman, stumbles upon an online pro-eating disorder subculture as cracks begin to appear in her seemingly perfect life.

Cast 
Karlee Roberts as Belle
Jeremy Fernandez as Gus
Lilla Crawford as Olivia
Izzy Palmieri as Lyla
Tom Degnan as Mr. Davy
Charlie Swan as Madison
Eden Wright as Sophia
Brandon Bernath as Joey
Cameron Fachman as Dave
Peter Rini as Maurice

Production

Script and development  
Little Miss Perfect was written by Marlee Roberts and originally began as an adaptation of the traditional French fairytale La Belle et la Bete, popularly known in English as Beauty and the Beast.

The adaptation borrowed Belle's studious perfectionistic nature and combined it with the Beast's shame and temper. Belle was given a father who set off on a work venture, a mother who is out of the picture, and a confident bordering-on-arrogant suitor.

In the classic fairytale, in order to break the Beast's curse, the Beast must learn to love someone and be loved in return. In Little Miss Perfect, where Belle and the 'beast' are one and the same, Belle must learn to love herself in order to rid herself of this 'beast'.

Little Miss Perfect began development under the mentorship of NYU Professor Karl Bardosh, and former VP of 20th Century Fox, Nancy Malone. Roberts revised the screenplay, continuing research at the NYU Child Study Center with doctors in adolescent psychology, to incorporate the behavioral psychology of eating disorders, primarily anorexia.

Filming 
Filming took place over four weeks in Stamford, Connecticut and New Rochelle, New York. Principal photography for the prestigious all-girls high school was shot on location at The College of New Rochelle campus and at the Leland Castle.

Release 
Little Miss Perfect premiered at the Irvine International Film Festival on January 21, 2016,  where it was nominated for Best Feature Film, and lead actress Karlee Roberts took home the Emerging Artist Award.

References

External links 
 
 

2016 films
Films based on Beauty and the Beast
American coming-of-age drama films
2010s coming-of-age drama films
2016 drama films
2010s English-language films
2010s American films